Johannes Schulte, O.S.A. (died 1489) was a Roman Catholic prelate who served as Auxiliary Bishop of Mainz (1466–1489) and Auxiliary Bishop of Paderborn (1455–1466).

Biography
Johannes Fabri was ordained a priest in the Order of Saint Augustine. On 13 Oct 1455, he was appointed during the papacy of Pope Callixtus III as Auxiliary Bishop of Paderborn and Titular Bishop of Syra. On 23 Oct 1466, he was appointed during the papacy of Pope Paul II as Auxiliary Bishop of Mainz. He served as Auxiliary Bishop of Mainz until his death on 15 Jun 1489. While bishop, he was the principal co-consecrator of Johann von Bayern, Bishop of Munster (1459).

References

External links and additional sources
 (for Chronology of Bishops) 
 (for Chronology of Bishops)  

15th-century German Roman Catholic bishops
Bishops appointed by Pope Callixtus III
Bishops appointed by Pope Paul II
1489 deaths
Augustinian bishops